Cheguevaria is a genus of fireflies (family Lampyridae), and the sole member of the subfamily Cheguevariinae.

Distribution
Cheguevaria are found in the Caribbean.

Systematics and nomenclature
The genus Cheguevaria is of uncertain relationships, though possibly related to Amydetinae, and has been given placement as the sole member of its own subfamily, after previously being considered as incertae sedis within the Lampyridae. The genus name is in homage to Marxist revolutionary leader Che Guevara.

Species
 Cheguevaria angusta Kazantsev, 2006 from the Dominican Republic
 Cheguevaria taino Kazantsev, 2006 from Puerto Rico 
 Cheguevaria montana Kazantsev, 2008 from Puerto Rico

References

Lampyridae
Lampyridae genera